Kicking Mule Records was an American independent record label, founded in Berkeley, California in 1971 by guitarist Stefan Grossman and Eugene "ED" Denson, formerly co-owner of Takoma Records. The company's name comes from the country blues sexual two-timing allegory "there's another mule kicking in your stall".

During the 1970s, the company did much to popularize solo fingerpicking guitar, expanding the style with recordings of Scott Joplin rags, Beatles hits, big band tunes, and Turlough Carolan harp tunes. The label also released several similarly-styled banjo records.

In the 1980s, Grossman left the label and Denson branched out to include many dulcimer releases as well as recordings by Charlie Musselwhite and Michael Bloomfield. In the early 1990s, Fantasy Records bought both Takoma and Kicking Mule from Denson and soon began to re-release selected LPs on CD. In 2004, all of Fantasy's labels were purchased by Concord Records which was renamed them as the Concord Music Group. A few of the Kicking Mule titles were reissued by Intersound, and a few others were retained by Grossman and reissued by Shanachie Records.

Kicking Mule is handled by Ace Records.

Catalog

100 series - fingerpicking guitar

200 series - other stringed instruments

300 series - Blues, jazz and miscellaneous

See also
 List of record labels

References

External links
 Illustrated Kicking Mule Records discography
 LPs re-released on CD
 Stefan Grossman Guitar Videos homepage
 ED Denson homepage

Record labels established in 1972
Record labels disestablished in 2004
American independent record labels
Defunct record labels of the United States
Concord Music Group